Momina Duraid is a Pakistani director and producer. She is a senior producer and creative head of television network Hum TV and CEO of her own production company MD Productions. She has produced and created several series including Dastaan (2010), Qaid-e-Tanhai (2010–11), Humsafar (2011–12), Shehr-e-Zaat (2012), Zindagi Gulzar Hai (2012–13), Diyar-e-Dil (2015), Sadqay Tumhare (2015), Mann Mayal (2016), Udaari (2016), Bin Roye (2016), Yaqeen Ka Safar (2017), Suno Chanda (2018) and Ehd-e-Wafa (2019).

In 2015, Momina ventured into film direction and co-directed Bin Roye. Later that same year, she founded film production house, Hum Films. She is married to Duraid Qureshi and is a daughter-in-law of Hum Network president and founder, Sultana Siddiqui. In 2015, she was named among the Pond's list of Miracle Journey: The 100 Most Inspirational Women.

Career
Before entering into media, Momina was working as a marketing executive at bank, she said, "Media was the last thing I thought I would do. My mother-in-law, Sultana Siddiqui has been definitely associated with the industry as she worked for PTV but at the beginning, I was only looking after finances. I didn’t know that I would be stepping into the creative side of things." She produced Samira Fazal's Mere Paas Paas as her first independent drama series, that earned her critical acclaim. In 2010 she produced partition based drama series Dastaan based on the novel Bano by Razia Butt, the series starred then newcomer Fawad Khan with Sanam Baloch playing the title character of Bano. Dastaan received extravagant reception from critics and became one of the most acclaimed series of all time. At 1st Hum Awards ceremony serial was awarded Hum Honorary Most Challenging Subject Award, and received five nominations at 10th Lux Style Awards, winning Best Director for Haissam Hussain Momina then produced number of series and founded her own production company Momina Duraid Productions and became the senior producer of Hum TV.

In 2011, Momina convinced Farhat Ishtiaq to dramatize her novel Humsafar into a television series, which was previously rejected by two production houses. After its release Humsafar gained instant popularity and received the overwhelming response from critics and people all over the world. Critics regarded Humsafar as revival of drama industry. Sabahat Zakariya of Dawn News wrote, "If Haseena Moin was the benchmark of mass popularity back then, then Humsafar is an indicator of our endemic regressiveness." The series has a cult following with huge fan following especially in India, Europe and North America. The series lead actors Mahira Khan and Fawad Khan went on to become most popular actors in Pakistani film and television industry. Hum TV honored the craft and crew of serial giving them a special Hum Honorary Phenomenal Serial Award.

In 2015, Momina co-directed her first film Bin Roye under her production house Hum Films, that earned her rave reviews, and became the third highest-grossing Pakistani film of all time.  After the release of Bin Roye, Hum Films has distributed and produced over fifteen films both domestically and internationally.

In 2016, seven of ten-scheduled drama series that Momina produced including, Dastaan (2010), Humsafar (2011–12), Zindagi Gulzar Hai (2012–13), Sadqay Tumhare (2015) are set to release on online streaming service Netflix.

Filmography

Films

 Bin Roye (2015) as director
 Superstar (2019) as director

Television

 Man-o-Salwa (2007)
 Malaal (2009)
 Dastaan (2010)
 Qaid-e-Tanhai (2010–11)
 Mera Naseeb (2011)
 Humsafar (2011–12)
 Shehr-e-Zaat (2012)
 Zindagi Gulzar Hai (2012–13)
 Kankar (2013)
 Dil e Muztar (2013)
 Behadd (2013)
 Mohabat Subh Ka Sitara Hai (2013–14)
 Digest Writer (2014–15)
 Sadqay Tumhare (2014–15)
 Alvidaa (2015)
 Diyar-e-Dil (2015)
 Mann Mayal (2016)
 Udaari (2016)
 Bin Roye (2016)
 Yaqeen Ka Safar (2017)
 Dar Si Jaati Hai Sila (2018)
 Suno Chanda (2018)
 Ranjha Ranjha Kardi (2018–19)
 Aangan (2018–19)
 Suno Chanda 2 (2019)
 Ehd-e-Wafa (2019)
 Sabaat (2020)
 Chupke Chupke (2021)
 Parizaad (2021–22)
 Hum Tum (2022)

Awards and nominations

References

External links
 

1971 births
People from Karachi
Living people
Pakistani producers
Urdu film producers
Pakistani television producers
Pakistani film producers
Pakistani television directors
Pakistani directors
Pakistani film directors
Pakistani women film producers
Lahore University of Management Sciences alumni
Women television producers
Women television directors